Azerbaijan is nearly surrounded by mountains. The Greater Caucasus range lies to the northeast along the border with Russia and extends into northeastern Azerbaijan and runs southeast to the Absheron Peninsula. The Lesser Caucasus range lies to the west along the border with Armenia and the Talysh Mountains lies to the south along the border with Iran. There are mineral springs and very active mud volcanoes in Kobustan Mountain which is situated near Baku. The highest peaks in the Republic of Azerbaijan are situated in the Greater Caucasus, the Lesser Caucasus and Talysh mountain systems. The highest peak in the Republic of Azerbaijan is Bazarduzu.

Greater Caucasus 
Greater Caucasus mountain systems stretch for about 1,200 kilometers from west-northwest to east-southeast, between the Taman Peninsula of Black Sea to the Absheron Peninsula of the Caspian Sea. Greater Caucasus ridge is not crossed with any river valleys. Therefore, it is also called Watershed ridge. Most part of the ridge elevation is over 3000m high:

Lesser Caucasus 
The spurs of the Lesser Caucasus (also called Little Caucasus, Russian Maliy Kavkaz) in southwestern Azerbaijan includes Shahdagh, Murovdagh, Karabagh Upland, Mikhtoken, Eastern Goyche, Dereleyez and Zangezur ridges, most of the Karabakh volcanic plateau, Bashkend- Destefur saddle.

Talysh mountain systems 
Talysh mountains (Azerbaijani: Talış dağları, Талыш дағлары, تالش داغلارى; Persian: کوههای تالش, Kuhhâye Tâleš) lies southeastward from the Lankaran Lowland in southeastern Azerbaijan to the lower part of the Sefid Rud  in northwestern Iran. The Talysh mountains include Talysh, Peshteser and Burovar ridges. A few peaks rise above 3,000 m.

See also 
 Shahdag National Park

References

External links
 Şahdağ 
 Mount Shahdagh or Mount Shahdag Mountain Information
 http://files.preslib.az/projects/azerbaijan/eng/gl2.pdf

Landforms of Azerbaijan
Mountains of Azerbaijan
Azerbaijan
Azerbaijan
Mountains
Azerbaijan
Azerbaijan